Telang Usan is a district, in Miri Division, Sarawak, Malaysia.

References